Battenberg (Eder) is a small town in Waldeck-Frankenberg district, the state of Hesse, Germany. The town is noted for giving its name to the Battenberg family, a morganatic branch of the ruling House of Hesse-Darmstadt, and through it, the name Mountbatten used by members of the British royal family, a literal translation of Battenberg.

Geography

Location 
The centre of Battenberg lies in the Ederbergland, or Eder Highland, to which the Burgwald abutting the town to the east also belongs, on the southern edge of the Sauerland and the Rothaargebirge. Lying between 320 and 650 m above sea level, the town is also crossed by the river Eder.

Neighbouring communities 
Battenberg borders in the north on the community of Bromskirchen, in the northeast on the community of Allendorf, in the southeast on the community of Burgwald (all three in Waldeck-Frankenberg), in the south on the community of Münchhausen am Christenberg (Marburg-Biedenkopf), and in the west on the towns of Hatzfeld (Waldeck-Frankenberg) and Bad Berleburg (Siegen-Wittgenstein in North Rhine-Westphalia).

Constituent communities 
Battenberg includes the following centres:

 Berghofen
 Dodenau
 Frohnhausen 
 Laisa

History 
In 778 fighting took place near Laisa and Battenfeld as part of Charlemagne's Saxon Wars. A branch of the Wittgenstein noble family began calling themselves the "Counts of Battenberg" in 1214 – compare Sayn-Wittgenstein. In 1232, Battenberg had its first documentary mention, and two years later it was granted town rights. The early-Gothic church dates from 1249. In 1297, the town's ownership was transferred to the Archbishops of Mainz. In 1464, the Amt of Battenberg passed to Hesse. In 1932, Battenberg became part of the Frankenberg/Eder district. As part of municipal reform in 1974, the districts of Frankenberg (including Battenberg) and Waldeck united to form the district of Waldeck-Frankenberg.

The dynasty of the counts of Battenberg ceased to exist in 1314, their castle was demolished throughout the following centuries. When Prince Alexander von Hessen-Darmstadt, the brother of the grand duke of Hesse, married Julia von Hauke, the orphaned daughter of the former Deputy Minister of War of Congress Poland, their liaison was not considered befitting of his rank. Therefore her brother-in-law made her countess of Battenberg in 1851 and princess of Battenberg in 1858. With her husband, who agreed to carry the same title and name, she lived near Seeheim-Jugenheim at "Schloss Heiligenberg", a re-modelled manor. Her sons Ludwig Alexander and Heinrich Moritz both served the British empire, their families anglicized their name to Mountbatten (Berg means "mountain, hill" in German) in 1917.

Population development

Politics

Town council 
Municipal elections held on 6 March 2016 apportioned the town council's 31 seats thus:

Note: Bürgerlisten are "citizens' lists", not actual political parties.

Coat of arms 
Battenberg's civic coat of arms might heraldically be described thus: Per pale sable and argent.

The tinctures come from the arms borne by the town's old overlords, the Counts of Battenberg(a branch of the Counts of Wittgenstein). Battenberg's arms have their roots in the 13th century, putting them among Hesse's oldest municipal coats of arms.

Various other charges have appeared in the arms over the centuries, however. Sometimes it was a tower, the Count of Battenberg and the Archbishop of Mainz, the Archbishop by himself, or the Wheel of Mainz. One version even showed the same simple composition seen here, but with gules (red) instead of sable (black). This would have made the arms identical to those currently borne by Buchloe in Bavaria.

Town partnerships 
  Senonches, France
  Romsey, United Kingdom
  Litvínov, Czech Republic
  Horní Jiřetín, Czech Republic
  Loon op Zand, Netherlands

Adoption 
 In 1954, Battenberg "adopted" Sudeten Germans who had been driven out of the community of Obergeorgenthal (Horní Jiřetín) in the Brüx district.

Notable people 

 Andreas Steinhöfel (born 1962), writer and translator
 Leonie Schwertmann (born 1994), volleyball player

References

External links 
 
 Laisa
 

Waldeck-Frankenberg